Zavkhan may refer to:

 Zavkhan Province, Mongolia
 several sums (districts) in different aimags of Mongolia:
 Zavkhan, Uvs
 Zavkhanmandal, Zavkhan
Zavkhan River, a river